Kamil Piroš (born November 20, 1978) is a Czech former professional ice hockey center/winger, who most notably played with HC Litvínov in the Czech Extraliga as well as the Atlanta Thrashers and the Florida Panthers in the National Hockey League (NHL). He was drafted in the eighth round, 212th overall, by the Buffalo Sabres in the 1997 NHL Entry Draft.

Playing career
Piroš played six seasons in the Czech Extraliga before coming to North America. During that time, Buffalo Sabres traded his NHL rights (along with a fourth-round draft pick) to the Atlanta Thrashers in exchange for Donald Audette. Piroš joined the Thrashers' American Hockey League affiliate, the Chicago Wolves, in the 2001–02 season, playing in 64 games and scoring 49 points. He also made his NHL debut that season with Atlanta, playing in eight games.

Over the next two seasons, Piroš would appear in 101 more AHL games with the Wolves and 17 more NHL games with the Thrashers. In March 2004, Atlanta traded Piroš to the Florida Panthers in exchange for Kyle Rossiter.  After finishing the season with the Panthers' organization (playing three NHL games with Florida and 14 games with their AHL affiliate, the San Antonio Rampage), Piroš left for the Russian Super League. In his NHL career to date, he has appeared in 28 games, recording four goals and adding four assists.

Piroš played two seasons in Russia, one each with Khimik Voskresensk and HC Neftekhimik Nizhnekamsk. In the 2006–07 season, Piroš joined EV Zug in the Swiss Nationalliga A and left for two seasons with Kölner Haie in German Deutsche Eishockey Liga. In late January 2009, he signed with the Swedish Elitserien club HV71 for the remainder of season 2008–09. He left in June 2009 to sign with the Finnish SM-liiga team Ässät Pori, and in late November moved back to Elitserien, this time with Timrå IK.

Career statistics

Regular season and playoffs

International

Awards and honours

References

External links

1978 births
Ässät players
Atlanta Thrashers players
Avtomobilist Yekaterinburg players
Buffalo Sabres draft picks
Chicago Wolves players
Czech ice hockey centres
EV Zug players
Czech expatriate ice hockey players in Russia
Florida Panthers players
HC Khimik Voskresensk players
HC Litvínov players
HC Most players
HC Neftekhimik Nizhnekamsk players
HC Vítkovice players
HV71 players
Kölner Haie players
Living people
Sportspeople from Most (city)
San Antonio Rampage players
Timrå IK players
Czech expatriate ice hockey players in the United States
Czech expatriate ice hockey players in Sweden
Czech expatriate ice hockey players in Switzerland
Czech expatriate ice hockey players in Germany
Czech expatriate ice hockey players in Finland